Amblyseius humilis is a species of mite in the family Phytoseiidae.

References

humilis
Articles created by Qbugbot
Animals described in 1997